is a bus company on Okinawa Island, established September 1, 2006, and headquartered in Tomigusuku City. They operate throughout the island, but primarily in the South and Central, and currently operate 6 bus models. The average cost is ¥220 for adults and ¥110 for children.

See also 

Toyo Bus

References

External links 
 http://www.ryukyubuskotsu.jp/

Bus companies of Japan
Transport in Okinawa Prefecture